The guenons are Old World monkeys of the genus Cercopithecus. Not all members of this genus have the word "guenon" in their common names; also, because of changes in scientific classification, some monkeys in other genera may have common names that include the word "guenon". Nonetheless, the use of the term guenon for monkeys of this genus is widely accepted.

All members of the genus are endemic to sub-Saharan Africa, and most are forest monkeys. Many of the species are quite local in their ranges, and some have even more local subspecies. Many are threatened or endangered because of habitat loss. The species currently placed in the genus Chlorocebus, such as vervet monkeys and green monkeys, were formerly considered as a single species in this genus, Cercopithecus aethiops.

In the English language, the word "guenon" is apparently of French origin. In French, guenon was the common name for all species and individuals, both males and females, from the genus Cercopithecus. In all other monkey and apes species, the French word guenon only designates the females. The 3 species such as the L'hoest's monkey, Preuss's monkey and the sun-tailed monkey were formerly included in the genus and now listed in a different genus Allochrocebus

Species list
Genus Cercopithecus

 C. diana group
 Diana monkey, Cercopithecus diana
 Roloway monkey, Cercopithecus roloway
 C. mitis group
 Greater spot-nosed monkey, Cercopithecus nictitans
 Cercopithecus nictitans nictitans
 Bioko putty-nosed guenon, Cercopithecus nictitans martini
 Blue monkey, Cercopithecus mitis
 Pluto monkey, Cercopithecus mitis mitis
 Silver monkey, Cercopithecus doggetti
 Golden monkey, Cercopithecus kandti
 Sykes' monkey, Cercopithecus albogularis
Zanzibar Sykes' monkey, Cercopithecus albogularis albogularis
 Pousargues' Sykes' monkey, Cercopithecus albogularis albotorquatus
 Cercopithecus albogularis erythrarchus
 Cercopithecus albogularis francescae
 Cercopithecus albogularis kibonotensis
 Cercopithecus albogularis kolbi
 White-lipped monkey, Cercopithecus albogularis labiatus
 Cercopithecus albogularis moloneyi
 Cercopithecus albogularis monoides
 Cercopithecus albogularis phylax
 Cercopithecus albogularis schwarzi
 Zammarano's white-throated guenon, Cercopithecus albogularis zammaranoi
 C. mona group
 Mona monkey, Cercopithecus mona
 Campbell's mona monkey, Cercopithecus campbelli
 Lowe's mona monkey, Cercopithecus lowei
 Crested mona monkey, Cercopithecus pogonias
 Cercopithecus pogonias pogonias
 Cercopithecus pogonias nigripes
 Cercopithecus pogonias grayi
 Cercopithecus pogonias schwarzianus
 Wolf's mona monkey, Cercopithecus wolfi
 Cercopithecus wolfi wolfi
 Cercopithecus wolfi elegans
 Dent's mona monkey, Cercopithecus denti
 C. cephus group
 Lesser spot-nosed monkey, Cercopithecus petaurista
 Cercopithecus petaurista petaurista
 Cercopithecus petaurista buettikoferi
 White-throated guenon, Cercopithecus erythrogaster
 Red-eared guenon, Cercopithecus erythrotis
 Bioko red-eared guenon, Cercopithecus erythrotis erythrotis
 Cercopithecus erythrotis camerunensis
 Moustached guenon, Cercopithecus cephus
 Cercopithecus cephus cephus
 Cercopithecus cephus cephodes
 Ngotto guenon, Cercopithecus cephus ngottoensis
 Red-tailed monkey, Cercopithecus ascanius
 Cercopithecus ascanius ascanius
 Cercopithecus ascanius atrinasus
 Cercopithecus ascanius whitesidei
 Cercopithecus ascanius katangae
 Schmidt's guenon, Cercopithecus ascanius schmidti
Sclater's guenon, Cercopithecus sclateri

 C. hamlyni group
 Hamlyn's monkey, Cercopithecus hamlyni
 Owl-faced guenon, Cercopithecus hamlyni hamlyni
 Kahuzi owl-faced guenon, Cercopithecus hamlyni kahuziensis
 Lesula, Cercopithecus lomamiensis
 C. neglectus group
 De Brazza's monkey, Cercopithecus neglectus

Hybrids
The red-tailed monkey (Cercopithecus ascanius) is known to hybridize with the blue monkey (C. mitis) in several locations in the wild in Africa.

References

External links

 
 Primate Info Net Cercopithecus Factsheets

 01
Primates of Africa
Cercopithecini